Papyrus Oxyrhynchus 1007 (also known as LXX; P.Oxy. VII 1007; P.Lond.Lit. 199; TM 61956; LDAB 3113) is a fragment of a Greek Septuagint manuscript written on parchment. The manuscript was discovered in Oxyrhynchus, modern El-Bahnasa, Egypt. Using the study of comparative writing styles (palaeography), the manuscript has been dated to the 3rd century CE.

Description 

The manuscript is a codex (precursor to the modern book), containing sections of the Book of Genesis (2:7-9, 2:16-19 on the front; 2:23-3:1, 3:6-8 on the back) written in 33 lines in 2 columns. This manuscript contains the name of God "abbreviated by doubling the initial yod, written in the shape of a z with a horizontal line through the middle, and carried unbroken through both characters zz." The fragment is difficult to identify as either Christian or Jewish, as on the barely legible front side it contains the nomen sacrum ΘΣ (characteristic of Christian manuscripts) in Gen 2:18, and the name of God written in Hebrew with a double Yodh (characteristic of Jewish manuscripts).

Alan Mugridge states regarding LXX and Papyrus Oxyrhynchus 656:

History 
The manuscript was published in The Oxyrhynchus Papyri, part VII, edited and translated by Arthur S. Hunt, London, 1910, pages 1 and 2. It was catalogued with the number 907 in the list of manuscripts of the Septuagint as classified by Alfred Rahlfs, and also signed as Van Haelst 5. It is given the identification 3113 on the 
Leuven Database of Ancient Books.

Current location 
The manuscript is located in the department of manuscripts in the British library, London (Inv. 2047).

References

Bibliography

External links 
 Description of Manuscript at the British Library
 Images of P. Oxyrhynchus 1007 at the British Library
 The Oxyrhynchus Papyri, Part 7 online at Archive.org

3rd-century biblical manuscripts
1007
Book of Genesis
Septuagint manuscripts